Johannes Rauch (born 24 April 1959 in Rankweil) is an Austrian politician (Green Party). He serves as Federal Minister of Social Affairs, Health, Care and Consumer Protection in the government of chancellor Karl Nehammer since 8 March 2022. Before taking office as Federal Minister, he was Provincial Councillor for the Environment and Mobility in the Vorarlberg Provincial Government.

References

Living people
1959 births
21st-century Austrian politicians
Health ministers of Austria
The Greens – The Green Alternative politicians
People from Vorarlberg